Kanemaru (written: 金丸) is both a Japanese surname and a masculine Japanese given name. Notable people with the name include:

Surname
, Japanese politician
, Japanese voice actor
, Japanese professional wrestler
, Japanese sprinter

Given name
, Japanese boxer

See also
Kanemaru Station, a railway station in Ishikawa Prefecture, Japan

Japanese-language surnames
Japanese masculine given names